The National Unity Party, National United Party, Party of National Unity or National Unity Front may refer to:

 National United Party of Afghanistan (founded 2003)
 National Unity Party (Albania)
 National United Party (Armenia), defunct
 National Unity Front, in Bolivia (founded 2003)
 National Unity Party (Canada)
 National Unity Party (Central African Republic)
 Party of National Unity (Czechoslovakia)
 National Unity Party (Dominican Republic) (founded 2002)
 Party of National Unity (Fiji)
 National Unity Party (Guinea-Bissau)
 National Unity Party (Haiti)
 Party of National Unity (Hungary) (1932–1939)
 National Unity Party (Israel)
 National United Front of Kampuchea (1970–75)
 Party of National Unity (Kenya) (founded 2007)
 National Unity Party (Malawi)
 National Unity Party (Moldova)
 National Unity Party (Mozambique)
 National United Front, Myanmar (1955–1962)
 National Unity Party (Myanmar) (founded 1988)
 National Unity Party (Northern Cyprus)
 National Unity Party (Philippines)
 Front of National Unity, in Poland (1952–1983)
 National Unity Alliance, in Sri Lanka (1999–2010)
 National Unity Party (United States), the party affiliation under which John B. Anderson ran for president in 1980
 National United Party (Vanuatu)

See also 
 National Unity (disambiguation)
 National unity government
 National Unity Movement (disambiguation)
 National Party (disambiguation)
 United National Party, Sri Lanka
 United Party (disambiguation)
 Unity Party (disambiguation)